Blanco Encalda may refer to:
Manuel Blanco Encalada - first president of Chile
 See also Chilean ship Blanco Encalada for several ships of the Chilean Navy named "Blanco Encalada"